Macromia is a genus of large dragonflies in the family Macromiidae. 
They are commonly known as river cruisers from their habit of cruising long distances along river banks. Most species of Macromia occur in the tropical Australasian region, with one species being found in Europe (Macromia splendens),
and a few species occurring in North America.

Genera
The genus Macromia includes the following species:

References

Macromiidae
Odonata of Australia
Odonata of North America
Odonata of Oceania
Taxa named by Jules Pierre Rambur
Anisoptera genera
Taxonomy articles created by Polbot